There exists in Algeria many regions. Whether they are cultural, linguistic, historical, or geographical in nature, none are recognized as an administrative unit by the Algerian government. With regards to the administrative structuring of the country, Algeria is divided into 58 wilayas or provinces.

Here are some of the country's regions:

Regions of Africa by country

See also
Geography of Algeria

References 

Geography of Algeria